Lemhi is an unincorporated rural service point on the Lemhi River in Lemhi County, Idaho, United States. Lemhi consists of a combined general store and post office and a house. The post office services ZIP code 83465. As with the county, the name "Lemhi" is a variant spelling of Limhi, a personage of the Book of Mormon.

History
Lemhi's population was just 5 in 1960.

See also
 Fort Lemhi
 Lemhi Pass

References

Unincorporated communities in Lemhi County, Idaho
Unincorporated communities in Idaho